The 2011 Super Outbreak was the largest, costliest, and one of the deadliest tornado outbreaks ever recorded, taking place in the Southern, Midwestern, and Northeastern United States from April 25 to 28, 2011, leaving catastrophic destruction in its wake. Over 175 tornadoes struck Alabama, Mississippi, and Tennessee, which were the most severely damaged states. Other destructive tornadoes occurred in Arkansas, Georgia, Kentucky, Louisiana, New York, and Virginia, with storms also affecting other states in the Southern and Eastern United States. In total, 360 tornadoes were confirmed by NOAA's National Weather Service (NWS) and Government of Canada's Environment Canada in 21 states from Texas to New York to southern Canada. Widespread and destructive tornadoes occurred on each day of the outbreak. April 27 was the most active day, with a record 216 tornadoes touching down that day from midnight to midnight CDT (05:00–05:00 UTC). Four of the tornadoes were rated EF5, which is the highest ranking on the Enhanced Fujita scale; typically these tornadoes are recorded no more than once a year.

In total, 348 people were killed as a result of the outbreak, including 324 tornado-related deaths across six states and 24 fatalities caused by other thunderstorm-related events such as straight-line winds, hail, flash flooding or lightning. In Alabama alone, 238 tornado-related deaths were confirmed by the Storm Prediction Center (SPC) and the state's Emergency Management Agency. April 27's 316 fatalities were the most tornado-related fatalities in the United States in a single day since the "Tri-State" outbreak on March 18, 1925 (when at least 751 people were killed). Nearly 500 preliminary local storm reports were received for tornadoes over four days, including 292 in 16 states on April 27 alone. This event was the costliest tornado outbreak in United States history, with total damage reaching $10.2 billion (equivalent to $ billion in ).

Meteorological synopsis

The outbreak was caused by a vigorous upper-level trough that moved into the Southern Plains states on April 25. An extratropical cyclone developed ahead of this upper-level trough between northeastern Oklahoma and western Missouri, and moved northeastward. Conditions were similar on April 26, with a predicted likelihood of severe thunderstorms, including an extended threat of strong to violent long-track tornadoes throughout the afternoon and evening hours; mixed-layer CAPE values were forecast to be around 3000–4000 J/kg, around east Texas, Louisiana, and Arkansas. The storm mode on April 26 was predicted to include mostly discrete tornadic supercells during both the afternoon and the early evening, shifting over to a mesoscale convective complex, with more of a threat of damaging winds and hail during the nighttime hours.

As the storm system moved eastward toward the Ohio, Mississippi, and Tennessee Valleys on April 27, a very powerful 80–100 knot mid-level jet stream moved into the Ohio and Tennessee Valleys behind the trough and created strong wind shear, along with a low pressure center moving quickly northeastward across those areas on April 27. During the afternoon of April 27, CAPE values were estimated to be in the range of 2000–3000 J/kg across Louisiana and southern Mississippi, with the moderate instability moving northeastward across the southern Tennessee Valley; additionally, temperatures across the southeastern United States ranged from the 70s °F (mid-20s °C) to the lower 90s °F (near 35 °C). Helicity levels ranged from 450 to 600 m2/s2, which supported some significant tornadic activity and strong to violent long-track tornadoes.

A total of 56 severe weather watches were issued by the Storm Prediction Center (SPC) over those four days in the outbreak area. This included 41 tornado watches—10 of which were particularly dangerous situation (PDS) watches—and 15 severe thunderstorm watches. The SPC assigns numbers to each severe weather watch issued starting at the beginning of each year; the organization unsuccessfully used two of their allocated watch numbers during this outbreak (numbers 208 and 209).

April 25
A large area of possible severe storms for April 25–27 was forecast as the Storm Prediction Center (SPC) issued a moderate risk of severe weather for three consecutive days, centered over Arkansas through Tennessee. At 3:25 p.m. CDT (20:25 UTC), the SPC issued a particularly dangerous situation (PDS) tornado watch for much of Arkansas and parts of Missouri, Oklahoma, Texas, and Louisiana.  By the evening hours of April 25, tornadoes had been reported across a few states, some of which caused significant damage in Arkansas. An intense supercell thunderstorm tracked near the Little Rock area and a tornado emergency was declared for the city of Vilonia. A large EF2 wedge tornado struck the town, subsequently causing severe damage and killing four people. A strong EF3 tornado had also struck the Hot Springs Village area earlier that evening; that tornado caused severe damage and resulted in one death. Later that evening, another EF2 tornado caused extensive damage to both a school building and Little Rock Air Force Base as well. Severe flooding continued across a large area from the Red River valley to the Great Lakes. A total of 42 tornadoes and five tornado-related deaths were confirmed on the 25th.

April 26

A high risk of severe weather was issued for April 26 for portions of Louisiana, Arkansas, Oklahoma, and Texas along and near the Interstate 30 corridor as conditions became even more favorable for extreme weather. A large PDS tornado watch with very high possibilities for tornadoes was issued for that same area that afternoon. Widespread tornado warnings were then issued in that area later that evening.

An upper-level negatively-tilted trough with two embedded shortwaves generated two surface lows that propagated generally east. One of the surface lows tracked northeast along the Mississippi River into Wisconsin as it occluded. Tornado watches were issued for the Lower Great Lakes during the afternoon hours as supercell thunderstorms developed along the warm front lifting north across central Michigan. Two tornadoes touched down in Michigan and caused damage to farm structures. Further east, severe thunderstorms caused scattered wind damage and large hail across Pennsylvania and New York. Two-inch-diameter hail was reported in Lock Haven, Pennsylvania. An isolated supercell moved across Central New York throughout much of the afternoon, producing golf ball-sized hail in Syracuse and spawning a very brief EF1 tornado in Verona Mills, which primarily caused damage to trees. Another tornado — this one being in Gilbertsville — caused significant damage to a school's athletic field.

The second surface low corresponded to an area of strong upper level divergence ahead of the downstream shortwave. As the low formed across Texas and deepened while moving east, a tightening pressure gradient force further strengthened the low-level jet, therefore creating a broad warm sector across the southeastern states. This also generated stronger wind shear, providing better organization for the supercell storms as a result. Numerous tornadoes touched down across several states, including Texas, Louisiana, Arkansas. Most of those tornadoes were weak, but a few of them caused considerable damage. A long-tracked wedge tornado caused EF2 damage in rural portions of Texas and Louisiana. An EF3 tornado destroyed structures and caused severe damage at Fort Campbell, Kentucky, as well. A total of 55 tornadoes were confirmed on the 26th, although no fatalities occurred.

April 27

Significant severe weather was ongoing early on April 27 (in the overnight hours) and continued for the entire calendar day virtually unbroken. For the second day in a row, the SPC issued a high risk of severe weather for the Southern United States. Later that morning, the SPC even increased the probability for tornadoes to 45 percent along a corridor from Meridian, Mississippi, to Huntsville, Alabama, an extremely rare issuance exceeding the high risk standards. Conditions became increasingly favorable for tornadoes during such an extreme tornado outbreak.

Morning squall lines
During the early morning hours, a cold front with several embedded low pressure areas extended from east Texas northeastward into the Ohio River Valley. An upper-level disturbance that had moved across the frontal boundary the previous evening sparked an area of thunderstorms that morphed into a squall line. This line of severe thunderstorms would produce tornadic activity from the evening on April 26 into the late morning of April 27. Early in the morning the squall line, packing straight-line winds and numerous embedded tornadoes, moved through Louisiana and Mississippi before proceeding to affect North and Central Alabama and parts of Middle and East Tennessee. The line strengthened as it moved through Alabama, partially due to a high amount of low-level moisture from the Gulf of Mexico and increasing wind shear.

A majority of the tornadoes embedded in this initial squall line were weak, though several were strong and as such caused significant damage. An EF3 tornado caused major damage to homes in Coaling, Alabama, an EF2 and an EF3 tornado produced severe damage and a fatality near Eupora, Mississippi. Another EF3 tornado resulted in heavy damage in downtown Cordova, Alabama, which was struck by a violent EF4 tornado later that afternoon. An EF2 also struck Cahaba Heights near Birmingham. One embedded cell began producing tornadoes just after 5:00 a.m. CDT (10:00 UTC), starting with an EF1 tornado striking Berry, Alabama. This was soon followed by the Cordova EF3 tornado. As the line entered Cullman County, Alabama, the cell, a mesoscale convective vortex (MCV), began exhibiting a comma head appearance and produced another long-tracked EF2 tornado that struck the town of Hanceville, killing one person. The MCV would then produce 13 tornadoes (most rated EF1) to the northeast in Marshall County, many of which occurred simultaneously. Two more tornadoes were produced as the comma head-shaped embedded cell continued northeast along the Jackson/DeKalb county line, including a long-track EF1 that resulted in a fatality near Pisgah. The same area was impacted later that day by a high-end EF4 tornado. Another EF1 tornado occurred in Dade County, Georgia with the cell, and six more tornadoes struck Hamilton County, Tennessee, five of which were in the Chattanooga area. The 26th and final tornado produced by the MCV was an EF2 tornado in northern Bradley County, Tennessee, which hit at 9:45 a.m. EDT (13:45 UTC). The initial storms caused widespread power and telephone line outages across Alabama and Tennessee. This line of storms also caused some NOAA weather radio transmitter sites to stop functioning for the remainder of the outbreak. Because of this, more than one million customers were without power and had no warning of any approaching tornadoes later that day.

From the late morning to the early afternoon, another squall line moved through northern parts of Mississippi and Alabama as high wind shear and low-level moisture persisted. However, this time several discrete supercells developed along and in front of the line, spawning seven weak tornadoes across Morgan, Limestone, and Madison Counties in northern Alabama around noon that day.

Afternoon supercells

The most intense supercells of the outbreak developed around midday in central Mississippi and began tracking eastward. With the extreme instability and wind shear, they quickly intensified and eventually became tornadic, shortly thereafter resulting in strong to violent tornadoes. Responding to the high risk issued by the SPC and the already unstable atmosphere expected to become even more unstable throughout the afternoon hours, a PDS tornado watch was issued at 1:45 p.m. CDT (18:45 UTC) for much of Alabama and portions of Mississippi, Tennessee, and Georgia. A widespread complex of supercell storms overspread the states of Mississippi and Alabama and violent tornadoes began rapidly touching down as the afternoon progressed. 

By mid-afternoon, as wind shear and low-level moisture continued to dramatically increase, a tornado emergency was declared for Neshoba County, Mississippi, as a large tornado was reported on the ground by both storm spotters and a camera atop a television tower from ABC affiliate WTOK-TV (channel 11) in Meridian, Mississippi. Three people died when a mobile home was thrown  into a wooded area, obliterating it in the process. Another very long-tracked EF4 tornado passed near the town of Enterprise, Mississippi, killing seven people before crossing into Alabama and eventually dissipating. Four tornadoes were officially rated EF5 on the Enhanced Fujita scale that day. One of those EF5 tornadoes struck the town of Smithville, Mississippi, where many well-built brick homes were reduced to bare slabs, numerous hardwood trees were completely debarked, and an SUV was hurled half a mile into the top of the town's water tower, subsequently leaving behind a visible dent. Another long-tracked EF5 wedge tornado passed through rural portions of Alabama and Tennessee, becoming the deadliest tornado of the outbreak as it completely devastated the towns of Hackleburg, Phil Campbell, Mount Hope, Tanner, and Harvest, killing 72 people. This marks only the second day in history (after April 3, 1974) that there were more than two F5/EF5 tornadoes reported.

The tornadoes continued tracking through central Alabama that afternoon and into the early evening hours. A dangerous and destructive tornado struck the city of Cullman, Alabama, at around 3:00 p.m. CDT (20:00 UTC). This large, multiple-vortex tornado was captured on several tower cameras from television stations, such as Fox affiliate WBRC (channel 6) and ABC affiliate WBMA-LD/WCFT-TV/WJSU-TV (channels 58, 33, and 40) both out of Birmingham. The tornado caused extensive destruction in the city's downtown area; it was ultimately rated EF4. The final damage count was 867 residences and 94 businesses in Cullman; six people died as well. The town of Cordova, Alabama, which had already been damaged by an EF3 tornado from the initial round of storms, was struck by an EF4 tornado that killed 13 people. Two violent EF4 tornadoes also ripped through Jackson County, Alabama, one of which caused a fatality near Bridgeport while the other passed near Pisgah and into Georgia where it caused major damage in Trenton and killed 14 people. At around 5:10 p.m. CDT (22:10 UTC), a very large and exceptionally destructive tornado struck Tuscaloosa, Alabama, and about 40 minutes later, that same tornado struck the northern suburbs of nearby Birmingham. A tornado emergency was issued for both cities, along with many other cities that day. Many local television stations, including WBRC and WBMA-LD/WCFT/WJSU, as well as CBS affiliate WIAT (channel 42), broadcast live footage of this long-tracked tornado in both Tuscaloosa and Birmingham. A debris ball was observed by the Birmingham NEXRAD, indicating that the tornado was causing extreme damage. This tornado killed 64 people and caused extensive devastation in densely populated areas, and the tornado struck several of the same small communities as the April 1956 F4, the April 1977 F5 and the April 1998 F5 tornadoes that hit portions of the Birmingham area. The supercell that produced the Tuscaloosa/Birmingham EF4 tornado originated in Newton County, Mississippi. The supercell also produced an EF4 tornado later that evening that killed 22 people and struck the Ohatchee, Alabama, area and eventually crossed into Georgia, causing additional damage near Cave Spring before dissipating. Further to the south, a mile-wide EF3 tornado killed 7 people in mostly rural areas and caused major damage in the small town of Eoline. The final EF5 tornado of the day caused remarkable damage in and around the town of Rainsville, Alabama, killing 25 people before crossing into Georgia and dissipating. Tornadoes continued touching down further to the northeast as the sun set, particularly in Georgia. This included a long-tracked EF4 tornado that caused major damage in Ringgold, Georgia, Apison, Tennessee, and Cleveland, Tennessee, killing 20 people along the path. After dark, violent tornadoes continued to touch down, and a nighttime EF4 tornado destroyed many lakeside homes at Lake Martin in eastern Alabama, killing seven people. Additional strong nighttime tornadoes occurred in Georgia, including an EF3 that killed two people in Barnesville, and another EF3 that destroyed homes and killed one person at Lake Burton.

Continued activity farther east
Powerful tornadoes touched down across Tennessee as well that evening. A violent EF4 struck the community of New Harmony, Tennessee, where homes were leveled, vehicles were tossed, and four people were killed. Two EF3 tornadoes crossed paths in Greene and Washington counties (coming a couple hours apart), resulting in eight fatalities. The rural communities of Horse Creek and Camp Creek suffered major damage from those tornadoes late that evening. A very large EF4 wedge tornado leveled a mile-wide swath of forest through  of Great Smoky Mountains National Park. At Chilhowee Lake, large metal power line truss towers were torn and thrown from their concrete supports that they were anchored to.

A secondary area of severe weather also developed that afternoon and evening along a corridor extending from central and northern Virginia northward through Maryland, Pennsylvania, and New York, continuing into early April 28. Many tornadoes touched down in this area as well. Most of these tornadoes were weak, though an EF2 tornado touched down near the town of Halifax, Virginia, and caused severe damage to homes in the area, resulting in one death. Tornado alerts were issued for Southern Ontario as far north as Ottawa as well; one tornado was later confirmed in Fergus, Ontario.

Overview

A statewide review by emergency management officials recorded 249 fatalities in Alabama as of the morning of April 30, 23 of which were not tornado-related. Eventually, a total of 238 tornado-related deaths would be confirmed in the state. Damage and power outages in the Huntsville area were so widespread that at one point over 650,000 people were out of power in the Tennessee Valley Authority system. The EF5 tornado that struck Hackleburg and Phil Campbell damaged main high-transmission power lines coming from Browns Ferry Nuclear Plant near Tanner. These towers were the main supply of electrical power to much of North Alabama, and some were without power for two weeks. The tornado just missed the Limestone Correctional Facility, which less than a year later would be struck by another tornado.

The Storm Prediction Center received 292 reports of tornadoes in the preceding 24 hours. In addition to setting the record for most tornadoes in a calendar day (216; midnight to midnight CDT (05:00 – 05:00 UTC)), it also broke the record for the most tornado touchdowns in any 24-hour period with 219 from 12:40 a.m. to 12:40 a.m. CDT (05:40 – 05:40 UTC) April 27–28, breaking the old 24-hour record of 148 set by the 1974 Super Outbreak. Of those 219 tornadoes, 59 touched down in Alabama and 77 hit the ground in Tennessee, accounting for 62 percent of the tornadoes that touched down on April 27. On April 27 alone, the National Weather Service in Huntsville, Alabama, issued 92 tornado warnings, 31 severe thunderstorm warnings, and seven flash flood warnings.

April 28
Tornado watches were issued for the Atlantic coast from Pennsylvania to Florida at the start of the day and continued through the morning and early afternoon, but tornadoes were forecasted to generally be weaker and more isolated. Despite this, the secondary portion of the outbreak that had begun producing scattered tornadoes throughout the Mid-Atlantic and East Coast regions the previous evening intensified during the early hours of the morning, producing numerous tornadoes. A particularly active region, in which there were some strong tornadoes, was the Interstate 81 corridor extending from southwest Virginia,  northward through the Shenandoah Valley and into Pennsylvania, and New York. This included the deadly EF3 tornado that struck the town of Glade Spring, Virginia, very early in the morning, where three people died. Tornadoes were also reported in Florida, Georgia, South Carolina, North Carolina, and Maryland.  Most of these tornadoes were weak. Although tornado watches were issued, no tornadoes were spotted in New Jersey or Washington, D.C. In the wake of the tornadoes and severe thunderstorms, widespread flooding hit the Midwest, South, and Eastern Seaboard, with extensive flood and flash flood warnings issued. The last tornadoes of the outbreak touched down that afternoon in eastern North Carolina, which was hard hit in the April 16 outbreak, though the tornadoes that impacted the area this time around were weak. The system moved out into the Atlantic Ocean that evening, with the exception of isolated thunderstorms over central Florida that night into April 29, although no more tornadoes were produced.

Confirmed tornadoes

* One tornado touched down in Ontario, Canada, on April 27 and was rated as an F0. It is counted as an EF0 in this table.

A record 360 tornadoes touched down over the span of four days, 37 of which were EF3+ tornadoes. Four tornadoes were rated EF5 – behind only the 1974 Super Outbreak (7 F5s). Many tornadoes on the afternoon of April 27 were spawned from a collection of supercells that moved across Mississippi, Alabama, Tennessee, and Georgia.

Vilonia, Arkansas

The first tornado of the outbreak to cause more than one death was a long-tracked, high-end EF2 wedge tornado that struck the small town of Vilonia in Faulkner County, Arkansas, around 7:30 p.m. CDT (00:30 UTC) on April 25. A tornado warning was issued for the area roughly 30 minutes prior to the tornado's arrival, and the relatively low loss of life was attributed to this lead time. A tornado emergency was declared at 7:24 p.m. CDT (00:24 UTC) for the city shortly before the tornado struck. Four people were killed in the town and many more were injured. The tornado touched down northwest of Ferndale in Pulaski County at 6:48 p.m. CDT (23:48 UTC), downing trees and transmission towers at EF1 intensity. It continued northeast of Natural Steps, severely damaging a small church and downing numerous trees, one of which landed on a house. The tornado continued to knock down trees as it passed near Roland, several of which landed on homes. The tornado reached EF2 strength as it crossed into Faulkner County and passed southeast of Mayflower, downing numerous trees and power lines and damaging homes and outbuildings. Past Mayflower, it continued towards Vilonia and struck a mobile home park, where numerous mobile homes were destroyed and the four fatalities occurred. Two of the fatalities occurred when a couple attempted to take shelter in a cargo container, which was thrown  and deposited near a pond. Several other people were injured in this area as well. The tornado maintained EF2 intensity as it moved directly through Vilonia, damaging numerous homes and businesses and flipping several semi-trucks. The American Red Cross indicated that approximately 34 site-built houses and 62 mobile homes were destroyed, 91 site-built homes and 41 mobile homes suffered major damage, 145 site-built houses and 43 mobile homes had minor damage, and 53 site-built houses and 38 mobile homes were affected in some other way in the Vilonia area. The lone occupant of the mobile home sustained major injuries. After moving through Vilonia, the tornado weakened to EF1 strength as it moved into White County and passed west of El Paso, where trees were blown over onto houses (damaging several roofs), barns and outbuildings were destroyed, an RV and the trailer portion of a tractor-trailer were overturned, and hundreds of trees were downed. The tornado finally dissipated north of Joy at 7:59 p.m. Following the tornado, 85 members of the U.S. National Guard were deployed to assist in search and rescue, debris clearing, security and traffic control.

On April 27, 2014, three years and two days after this tornado, a violent EF4 tornado touched down west of Ferndale and moved along almost the same path as this tornado, causing 16 fatalities and many injuries. However, it affected more of Mayflower than this tornado did and caused greater damage all along the path, especially in Vilonia, before lifting near El Paso.

Philadelphia–Kemper County, Mississippi

The first EF5 tornado of the outbreak touched down near the city of Philadelphia, Mississippi, on April 27. The tornado touched down at 2:30 p.m. The tornado killed three people, injured eight others, and caused $1.1 million in damage across its path.

The supercell thunderstorm that produced this tornado formed around 1:00 p.m. CDT south of Jackson, Mississippi. Traveling briskly to the northeast, it warranted a severe thunderstorm warning within 25 minutes and was deemed potentially tornadic by 1:36 p.m. CDT. A tornado finally touched down at 2:30 p.m. CDT just east of the Philadelphia Municipal Airport. It quickly intensified and began producing EF5 damage by 2:38 p.m. After crossing into Kemper County, the tornado obliterated a mobile home, killing all three inside. It reached EF5 strength a second time near the Kemper–Winston county line where extreme ground scouring again took place and pavement was scoured. Extreme tree damage took place along the track and it ultimately dissipated at 3:00 p.m.

This was the first tornado to cause F5/EF5 damage in Mississippi since the Candlestick Park tornado on March 3, 1966. Additionally, the formation of the Smithville tornado later that day marked the first time since statistics have been kept that two EF5 tornadoes have been recorded in Mississippi on the same day. Prior to this, the last confirmed EF5 tornado was the Parkersburg, Iowa, tornado on May 25, 2008.

Cullman/Arab, Alabama

Rated EF4, this highly visible multiple-vortex tornado tracked directly through downtown Cullman. The tornado touched down at 2:40 p.m. CDT (19:40 UTC) on April 27 and tracked a  damage path through Cullman, Morgan, and Marshall Counties, causing six deaths.

The Cullman tornado first touched down on the north side of Lewis Smith Lake and caused light structural damage near Crane Hill before intensifying and tracking directly towards Cullman, snapping numerous trees and heavily damaging several homes. The tornado entered Cullman while being tracked and broadcast live via several tower cameras, including those operated by Birmingham Fox affiliate WBRC (channel 6) and ABC affiliate WBMA-LD/WCFT-TV/WJSU-TV (channels 58, 33, and 40 - "ABC 33/40"), for several minutes. The ABC 33/40 camera captured the destruction of a communications tower belonging to Cullman area low-power television station WCQT-LP as the tornado ripped through the city at EF3 intensity. Radio stations in downtown Cullman also reported on the tornado and some even captured it passing over until power was knocked out. Downtown Cullman was badly damaged by the tornado, with the major damage being along a two-block area through the center of the downtown business district. Numerous well-built brick buildings and storefronts in downtown Cullman were heavily damaged or completely destroyed, along with churches, as the tornado briefly attained EF4 intensity. Damage to the Christ Lutheran Church in downtown was rated low-end EF4 as most of the structure completely collapsed. The courthouse and nearby emergency management building took a direct hit from the tornado, sustaining considerable damage, and two school buildings were heavily damaged as well. Many well-known businesses, such as Vincent's Furniture, The Cullman Times, and the Busy Bee Cafe, were also severely damaged/destroyed. Many homes were damaged or destroyed in residential areas of the city, with extensive tree and power line damage noted as well. In all, a total of 867 residences and 94 businesses within the city of Cullman were damaged or destroyed.

The tornado, more or less, followed U.S. 278 through the city, in which it created extensive damage along many major intersections, including those with Interstate 65, U.S. 31, AL 157, and AL 69. The tornado continued northeast, becoming large and wedge-shaped as it reattained EF4 intensity. It then passed just north of Fairview, completely destroying homes and debarking numerous hardwood trees. Pieces of debris were found speared through vehicles in this area. The tornado then briefly passed through a section of Morgan County near the town of Hulaco, destroying several older block-foundation homes and snapping numerous large trees off at the base. The tornado then crossed into Marshall County and impacted the rural community of Ruth, just north of Arab. A large but poorly-anchored brick home was swept completely away in this area, with the debris scattered 100 yards from the foundation. Several large trees on the property were ripped out of the ground and missing, along with a trailer that was unable to be located at the time of the survey. Other homes and structures were impacted in the Ruth area, and a gas station was completely destroyed. A shed was destroyed with pieces of large farm machinery stored inside thrown up to 20 yards away, a storage trailer was tossed 100 yards and found impaled by planks of wood, and steel power poles in the area were bent over. Arab's power grid was completely crippled by the tornado's effects, and many roads in the area were obstructed by downed trees and power lines. The tornado damaged and destroyed several other homes, garages, and sheds north of Union Grove before it crossed the Tennessee River just downstream of Guntersville Dam. It snapped numerous trees in a forested area before dissipating southeast of New Hope.

Hackleburg–Phil Campbell–Tanner–Harvest, Alabama/Huntland, Tennessee

This devastating, long-tracked, violent EF5 wedge tornado was the deadliest of the outbreak. CDT (21:00 UTC) on April 27, leaving massive damage along its track. The storm would eventually reach the Hackleburg area, completely leveling many homes and businesses, including a large Wrangler, Inc. factory. Most of the structures in downtown Hackleburg were badly damaged and Hackleburg High School was destroyed. Well-built homes were wiped cleanly from their foundations, extensive wind-rowing of debris occurred, trees were completely debarked, and cars were thrown hundreds of yards. According to the American Red Cross, 75 percent of the town was destroyed. While initially rated as an EF3, the rating was increased to EF5 after further analysis of the damage, making it the first F5/EF5 tornado in Alabama since the Birmingham tornado of April 8, 1998.

Soon after crossing into Franklin County,  the town of Phil Campbell experienced significant devastation of the same magnitude as Hackleburg. Numerous homes, some of which were well-constructed, were swept away as the tornado tore through town. At least three churches along the path sustained significant damage, with one church in the town being completely destroyed and having only the foundation slab remaining. Mobile homes throughout the path were completely destroyed, and their mangled frames were tossed at least . Cars were tossed and destroyed throughout the path of the tornado, with one car wrapped around a debarked tree. A  section of pavement was torn from a road in this area as well. The most intense damage along the path occurred northeast of Phil Campbell in the rural community of Oak Grove, where vehicles were carried long distances and mangled beyond recognition, large trees were completely debarked, and large brick homes with extensive anchoring were obliterated with the debris wind-rowed hundreds of yards away. The tornado continued into Lawrence County, impacting the Mount Hope community, where significant devastation was incurred to single-family homes and a restaurant. Nothing but the foundation and a pile of debris remained at the restaurant site, and a small portion of the restaurant's foundation slab buckled.

The tornado moved northeast, producing EF3 damage in and around Langtown. The tornado re-intensified to EF4 strength as it passed near Moulton and Trinity, debarking trees, mangling, and leveling homes. It then continued through the northwest corner of Morgan County, crossed Wheeler Lake, and moved into Limestone County, coming within  of Browns Ferry Nuclear Power Plant. The tornado caused power outages in the area, and the plant had to be shut down. The tornado continued towards the small community of Tanner. Tanner  experienced a large swath of EF4 damage and a narrow corridor of "high-end EF4 to near-EF5 damage". The storm "completely wiped clean" several well constructed homes with anchor bolting. As the storm crossed U.S. Highway 72 in eastern Limestone County, the tornado destroyed a Doppler radar operated by Huntsville NBC affiliate WAFF (channel 48) and continued into East Limestone, a heavily populated area of Limestone County where homes in subdivisions were damaged or destroyed at high-end EF3 strength. As the storm crossed into Madison County, it approached the densely populated suburban communities of Harvest and Toney, where it either damaged or destroyed hundreds of homes, especially in the Anderson Hills and Carter's Gin subdivisions. Many homes were reduced to rubble, and the damage in this area was rated mainly EF3 with a small pocket of EF4 damage in Harvest. The tornado completely destroyed a Piggly Wiggly grocery store in Harvest and severely damaged a convenience store and local bank, which was shut down for months following the event. The storm progressed across Pulaski Pike in northwest Madison County, damaging many homes. In all, hundreds of homes received moderate to major damage along the path from Limestone to Madison County with many of these being total losses.

The tornado then moved into Tennessee and continued south of Huntland. Isolated and minor EF0 to EF1 damage was noted through most of its path in Tennessee. Widespread damage to trees and outbuildings occurred in this area. The worst damage, however, was to a cinder block utility building and was rated lower-end EF3. Most of its roof was removed, with over half of its downwind wall pushed outward. The tornado eventually dissipated east of Huntland.

In total, this tornado killed 72 people, all in Alabama. This made it the deadliest single tornado ever to strike the state of Alabama as well as (at the time) the deadliest in the United States since the 1955 Udall, Kansas, tornado that killed 80 people.

Reform–Oakman–Cordova–Blountsville, Alabama

The tornado touched down at 3:40 p.m. CDT (20:40 UTC) in northeastern Pickens County, Alabama, damaging a few chicken homes at EF1 strength. The tornado caused roof damage to houses and destroyed a few outbuildings before moving into Tuscaloosa County and briefly into Fayette County, causing major EF2 tree damage and minor structural damage. The tornado then moved back into Tuscaloosa County, causing mostly minor tree and structural damage at EF1 strength before rapidly intensifying and crossing into Fayette County once again. There, it completely destroyed at least one mobile home, with the frame being separated and the remaining debris being thrown a considerable distance. The tornado appeared to strengthen even further and several mobile homes were obliterated with debris thrown a considerable distance and frames twisted and thrown. Damage was rated EF3 in this area. Many trees were downed as well before the tornado moved into Walker County. It then weakened to EF1 strength and caused mostly minor damage to trees and mobile homes. South of Oakman, numerous trees were snapped and uprooted, a cell phone tower was knocked down, and mobile homes were destroyed at EF2 intensity. It then rolled vehicles and destroyed a cinder block house to the southeast of Oakman, with damage rated EF3 at that location.

In Cordova, numerous homes and manufactured houses were either damaged or destroyed in this area along with many trees being downed. Some unanchored homes in town were swept from their foundations. Buildings in downtown Cordova had already been damaged by an EF3 tornado earlier that morning and received further damage from this tornado. East of Cordova, the tornado crossed the Mulberry Fork of the Black Warrior River three times (along with the Sipsey Fork once, just north of its confluence with the Mulberry Fork). It intensified further into a violent EF4 tornado in northeastern Walker County, as it completely leveled a site-built home and obliterated two nearby mobile homes. One of the mobile home undercarriages was tossed at least . A 5-ton bulldozer was flipped over, a pickup truck was tossed , and a dump truck was tossed  and destroyed. Two double-wide mobile homes were tossed at least , and a third mobile home was tossed  up a  embankment and destroyed along this segment of the path as well. South of Sipsey, additional homes and mobile homes were destroyed at EF2 to EF3 strength and numerous trees were snapped.

The tornado then crossed the Mulberry Fork for the fourth time and moved into Cullman County. South of Arkadelphia, a second area of EF4 damage was observed, as a cinder block construction home was leveled and a car was thrown . Nearby, an underground storm shelter collapsed onto the occupants sheltering inside as the tornado passed overhead. The tornado then crossed the Mulberry Fork again, moving into Blount County, where it caused EF1 roof damage to a home and snapped hundreds of trees. It then crossed Interstate 65 before crossing the Mulberry Fork into Cullman County southwest of Garden City, snapping numerous additional trees at EF1 strength. It quickly crossed the river again (the seventh crossing), moving back into Blount County. As it continued to the south-southwest of Garden City, it straddled the Mulberry Fork before finally moving solidly into Blount County and toward Blountsville. On the southeast side of Blountsville, the tornado downed many trees and caused high-end EF2 damage to well-built brick and slab foundation homes, one of which had some exterior walls collapse. The storm continued to the northeast and out of Blountsville, where two additional homes sustained high-end EF3 damage. A large portion of one of the homes was wiped off of its foundation; however, its garage sustained only minor roof damage. At the second of these two homes, a dump truck was thrown . The tornado then moved into Marshall County, causing significant damage to a house and downing numerous trees. A shed suffered roof damage and an industrial plant was completely destroyed at EF2 strength as well. The tornado then moved into a wooded area, weakened, and eventually lifted south-southwest of Guntersville at 5:56 p.m. CDT (22:56 UTC). Thousands of trees were downed along the tornado's path.

In total, 13 people were killed and 54 others were injured.

Smithville, Mississippi/Shottsville, Alabama

CDT (20:47 UTC) on April 27, resulting in catastrophic damage and numerous fatalities. CDT (20:42 UTC), snapping numerous trees near the Smithville Recreation Area. The tornado then rapidly intensified as it approached town, reaching EF5 intensity. As the storm crossed Davis Road South, the ground was deeply scoured in a nearby field. The tornado swept away numerous homes and structures as it moved northeast, following Highway 25. A semi-truck was thrown a considerable distance and destroyed in this area, and at one residence that was swept away, part of the concrete foundation slab was pulled up and dislodged slightly. Multiple well-anchored brick homes were completely swept away, and a large brick funeral home was reduced to a bare slab as the tornado exited at the northeast side of town, with the debris scattered and wind-rowed into an adjacent wooded area. Nearby granite tombstones were blown over in the opposite direction of the tornado's passage. Overall, the tornado destroyed 117 structures in Smithville and damaged 50 others, killing 16 people. The tornado weakened as it continued through rural areas northeast of town and moved into Itawamba County, where it downed numerous trees and power lines and caused roof damage to a house before exiting the county.

The tornado continued across the Alabama state line into Marion County, where it caused EF1-strength damage near Bexar. Continuing northeast, the tornado re-intensified as it struck the rural community of Shottsville at high-end EF3 intensity, where homes and mobile homes were destroyed and seven people were killed, and it produced additional high-end EF3 damage as it continued north of Hamilton. More structures were impacted as the tornado approached and crossed into Franklin County. The tornado then dissipated near the town of Hodges at 4:23 p.m. CDT (21:23 UTC).

Pisgah–Flat Rock–Higdon, Alabama/Trenton, Georgia

The tornado touched down north of Section, initially producing EF0 to EF1 tree damage. The tornado rapidly intensified to low-end EF4 strength as it passed northwest of Pisgah and Rosalie, destroying numerous mobile homes and block foundation homes, scattering the debris hundreds of yards and killing three people. As it passed near Flat Rock and Higdon, the tornado reached high-end EF4 strength, mowing down thousands of trees in this rural area. As the tornado struck a farm, a home and two chicken houses were completely obliterated and swept away. A heavy propane tank was lofted and thrown  from one of the chicken houses, and 19 cattle on the property were killed. Remarkably, a family of four taking shelter inside the house were completely unharmed. The tornado maintained EF4 strength as it tore through the rural community of Shiloh, sweeping away numerous mobile homes and block foundation homes and killing five people at that location. The tornado then crossed into Georgia and crossed Interstate 59 as it struck Trenton at EF3 intensity, killing two people. Dozens of homes in Trenton were either completely destroyed or sustained major damage, and tens of thousands of trees were downed in the area. A grocery store, two apartment complexes, and a funeral home were destroyed as well.

The tornado weakened to EF2 strength as it struck Flintstone further to the northeast, but still resulted in major damage. Numerous trees and power lines were downed, 7 homes were destroyed, 26 sustained major damage, and 35 sustained minor damage in the Flintstone area. The tornado continued northeast, weakening to EF0 strength before finally dissipating near Fort Oglethorpe.

Tuscaloosa–Birmingham, Alabama

A large multiple-vortex wedge tornado touched down in rural Greene County, Alabama, and tracked across neighboring Tuscaloosa County, including the southern and eastern portions of Tuscaloosa at around 5:10 p.m. CDT (22:10 UTC) on April 27. Skycams operated by Tuscaloosa television station WVUA-CA (channel 7) as well as Birmingham Fox affiliate WBRC (channel 6), ABC affiliate WBMA-LD/WCFT-TV/WJSU-TV (channels 58, 33, and 40), and CBS affiliate WIAT (channel 42) captured live footage of the tornado as it struck Tuscaloosa; WIAT received awards, including a regional Edward R. Murrow Award for "Outstanding Live Coverage" of the event). As the tornado traveled east to 35th Street and Kauloosa Avenue, the Tuscaloosa Environmental Services and Cintas facilities suffered severe damage. Numerous homes and apartment buildings in the Rosedale and Forest Lake neighborhoods, as well as a P&P Grocery store in Rosedale, were devastated. Several stores and restaurants in a business district at the intersection of McFarland Boulevard and 15th Street, near the DCH Regional Medical Center, were reduced to rubble. Buildings on 35th Street, between Interstate 359 and Martin Luther King Jr. Boulevard, were also completely destroyed. The Alberta City neighborhood in eastern Tuscaloosa sustained catastrophic damage as numerous homes, apartment buildings, and a shopping center were completely leveled. Additional low-end EF4 damage occurred in the Tuscaloosa suburb of Holt further to the northeast, as several homes were leveled or swept away in that area. The tornado then exited the Tuscaloosa area and moved through dense forest towards Birmingham, downing and debarking thousands of trees at low-end EF3 intensity.

The University of Alabama shut down its campus briefly during the course of the storm itself, resuming regular activities within minutes. Upon realizing the extent of the storm damage immediately off-campus, including areas of off-campus student housing, the university shut down all academic and extracurricular activities for the remainder of the day, and then, still later, for the remaining ten days of the academic semester. All final exams were cancelled, with all registered students receiving a final grade based on their grade as of the day of the storm. Spring commencement ceremonies were postponed until August 6. The university itself was undamaged by the storm, though six students enrolled at the university were later discovered to have perished.

Many stations, including WIAT, WBMA/WCFT/WJSU, WTVY (channel 4) in Dothan and WSFA (channel 12) in Montgomery, showed television cameras capturing the event as the tornado moved east-northeast across the western and northern suburbs of Birmingham around 6:00 p.m. CDT (23:00 UTC). It rapidly intensified to its maximum intensity and grew to its maximum width as it approached the area. Several suburbs in the area were severely damaged by the massive tornado as it tore through the west side of Birmingham, resulting in fatalities. The suburbs of Concord and Pleasant Grove were devastated by the high-end EF4 tornado as it moved northeast, flattening entire neighborhoods. The tornado then weakened, but still caused heavy EF2 damage to the community of McDonald Chapel. As the tornado entered the Birmingham city limits, it impacted the Pratt City neighborhood while still at EF2 strength, damaging numerous homes and apartment buildings. The tornado then struck the suburb of Fultondale, causing additional EF2 damage to homes and businesses before rapidly weakening and dissipating north of Tarrant.

Reports from Tuscaloosa indicated 44 people were killed, with an additional 20 deaths in Birmingham. Overall this tornado killed 64 people and injured more than 1500. President Barack Obama and First Lady Michelle Obama visited Tuscaloosa on April 29, taking a ground tour of some of the affected areas. Obama was quoted as saying that he had "never seen devastation like this". He stated further that he had already declared a federal state of emergency in Alabama.

Fackler–Stevenson–Bridgeport, Alabama/Haletown, Tennessee

CDT (22:05 UTC) on April 27, initially causing minor damage to mobile homes and downing trees. The tornado then moved northeast toward Stevenson, where large trees were downed, several roofs were damaged, a trailer was tipped over, and a shed was partially destroyed. It then reached EF3 intensity, and 24 metal high-tension truss towers were twisted and flattened northeast of Stevenson Airport. In this area, a mobile home was obliterated and a site-built house was collapsed. Two other homes sustained structural damage, two mobile homes were rolled on their side, and a metal barn was destroyed as well. The tornado then continued to the northeast and reached EF4 strength, with the most significant damage being located near the intersection of County Roads 255 and 256. Here, a home was reduced to its foundation, a concrete slab at the front of the home was pulled up, and a set of concrete stairs was ripped from the foundation.

Several large trees were snapped off just above the ground, a third home was left with no walls standing, and a mobile home was completely demolished and strewn along County Road 256 as well. The tornado continued northeastward, destroying a cinder block garage and damaging a mobile home along 6th Street, just southeast of the city of Bridgeport. It then crossed the Tennessee River, producing significant tree damage as it passed a couple miles to the northwest of Bryant before moving into Marion County, Tennessee. The tornado entered Tennessee along Lakeview Drive near Moore Crossing and Nickajack Dam. It crossed Highway 156 near the dam and proceeded to cross Nickajack Lake three times near Interstate 24 at EF2 strength, downing numerous trees before dissipating in a bend of the Tennessee River northeast of Haletown at 5:31 p.m. CDT (22:31 UTC).

One person was killed by the tornado in Jackson County, a teenager near Bridgeport.

Sawyerville–Eoline, Alabama

This strong, long-tracked EF3 wedge tornado touched down in extreme southwest Greene County to the west-southwest of Tishabee, near the Sumter County border, at 5:30 p.m. CDT (22:30 UTC) and moved northeast. After having touched down in a rural area on the east side of the Tombigbee River, the tornado quickly intensified to high-end EF2 strength along County Road 69. Moving northeast, the tornado damaged a barn and destroyed two small churches and at least four mobile homes. While crossing U.S. 43, the tornado destroyed a large metal outbuilding, caused substantial roof and wall damage to several brick buildings and homes. Hundreds of trees were downed in this area as well. Two people sustained minor injuries in Greene County as the tornado continued along a primarily rural path northeast, moving across the Black Warrior River and into Hale County.

The tornado entered Hale County west of Sawyerville, continuing to move through sparsely populated rural areas. North of Sawyerville, the tornado strengthened to EF3 intensity as it was crossing Alabama State Highway 14. The tornado caused extensive structural damage through this area, consisting of many mobile homes and site-built homes being either heavily damaged or destroyed. A church in the area was heavily damaged, vehicles were tossed around and destroyed, and thousands of trees were uprooted as well.

Leaving behind six fatalities and forty more injuries, the tornado maintained its intensity as it moved into the Talladega National Forest. It downed a significant number of trees before moving into Bibb County north of Alabama State Highway 25. In Bibb County, the tornado continued moving northeastward through the Talladega National Forest at EF3 intensity, with thousands more trees being knocked down and partially debarked. Almost immediately after exiting the national forest, the tornado directly impacted the small community of Eoline along U.S. Highway 82, northwest of Brent and Centerville. Around one dozen mobile homes and single-family site-built homes were destroyed, while many more sustained anywhere from minor to major damage. Additionally, the Eoline Volunteer Fire Department and another business were both destroyed. One fatality occurred in Eoline, in a vehicle near the fire department building, along with ten other injuries.

Northeast of Eoline, the tornado weakened to EF2 intensity, continuing to cause significant damage as it crossed County Road 9, Alabama State Highway 5, and County Road 26, south of West Blocton. Several mobile homes and site-built homes were either destroyed or sustained major damage. Along the path, thousands of trees were downed. The tornado continued to weaken as it moved to the east of West Blocton, continuing to knock down trees. More trees were downed as the tornado crossed the Cahaba River and lifted just northeast of Marvel at 6:55 p.m. CDT (23:55 UTC), not far from the Shelby County border.

In total, seven people were killed and an additional 52 were injured.

Raleigh–Rose Hill–Enterprise, Mississippi/Yantley–Uniontown, Alabama

This extremely long-tracked, violent EF4 tornado touched down near Raleigh, Mississippi, in Smith County at 5:42 p.m. CDT (22:42 UTC), and continued into the Uniontown, Alabama, area before dissipating. The tornado initially downed trees, blew skirting from mobile homes, and tore shingles from roofs. The tornado intensified as it moved northeast across Smith County and produced up to EF2 and EF3 damage. One mobile home was picked up, bounced a couple times, and thrown into a tree line, where it was torn apart and debris was scattered up to a mile away, including the frame. The tornado mowed down a stand of pine trees and destroyed two frame houses, with major damage to the interior walls, and the exterior walls completely destroyed. Many power poles were snapped, a mobile home was annihilated, and a large shop building was completely destroyed as well. It then moved into Jasper County and snapped and debarked many pine trees. The first area of EF4 damage was observed near Louin as a frame home and several mobile homes were completely destroyed, with parts of the mobile homes being thrown long distances, and some of the frame home foundation being swept clean. The tornado caused significant damage to a poultry farm and cattle ranch before it weakened briefly. It then destroyed two mobile homes and caused extensive tree and power line damage. The tornado then produced a relatively narrow path of EF1-strength tree and power line damage for several miles, until re-intensifying near to EF3 strength near Rose Hill.

Southeast of Rose Hill, the tornado removed most of the roof of a frame home and caused heavy damage to the exterior walls, took a large section of roof off another frame home, completely destroyed a large mobile home, and caused extensive tree damage. The tornado then weakened again and entered Clarke County as an EF0 while only downing a few trees. The tornado strengthened again and downed trees and power lines as it crossed Interstate 59. Several other homes and mobile homes were destroyed as the tornado moved along the south side of Enterprise. At the same time, Sean Casey of Team TIV shot the tornado with his new 3D camera as it was crossing I-59, making this the first tornado ever shot in 3D. Another area of EF4 damage was observed east of Enterprise as a new home undergoing completion was leveled, with the debris swept off the foundation. Many more frame homes were heavily damaged nearby. Many mobile homes were destroyed and trees were downed in this area as well. It then weakened slightly to EF3 strength and produced heavy damage to more houses and mobile homes near Snell and Energy. It also downed many more trees and power lines before moving into Choctaw County, Alabama, southwest of Yantley. The tornado killed seven people and injured fourteen others on its  portion of the path that was in Mississippi.

In Choctaw County, the tornado traveled  as it caused extensive damage to homes (one of which was destroyed at EF3 strength), and numerous other structures. Several mobile homes were destroyed and many trees were either snapped or completely uprooted. The tornado then moved into Sumter County. In Sumter County, the tornado caused significant damage to homes and mobile homes before it crossed the Tombigbee River and moved into Marengo County. It continued causing significant tree damage as well as destroying several homes and outbuildings along a  path in this county. The tornado then entered Perry County, the final portion of the path, where it damaged two outbuildings and a grain silo as well as causing significant tree damage before lifting just north of Uniontown at 8:35 p.m. CDT (01:35 UTC). The damage in Sumter, Marengo, and Perry Counties was rated EF2.

Seven people were killed and another 17 were injured.

Fyffe–Rainsville–Sylvania–Ider, Alabama/Rising Fawn, Georgia

This violent multiple-vortex tornado, rated EF5, began in the Lakeview community northeast of Geraldine, Alabama, at 6:19 p.m. CDT (23:19 UTC), during the late afternoon of April 27. The tornado tracked northeastward for  generally parallel to and just east of Highway 75 through Fyffe, Rainsville, and Sylvania and into Georgia, killing 25 people.

Initial damage in Lakeview consisted of structural damage to small buildings and snapped trees. The tornado grew in intensity as it struck Fyffe, where more significant damage occurred. A Huddle House restaurant, the Rainsville Civic Center, and a credit union were destroyed. Vehicles were also thrown, including a school bus that was completely stripped down to its chassis. Numerous homes in the Rainsville area were swept completely away, with debris strewn up to a mile from the foundations. Some of these homes were connected to their foundations with anchor bolts and foundation straps. Trees were debarked and mobile homes were completely destroyed as well. Damage was particularly intense just northeast of Rainsville, and one well-built stone house in this area was completely obliterated, with the debris strewn well away from the structure. A large supporting cement and stone pillar was ripped completely out of the ground at this residence, pulling up a section of concrete foundation in the process. Scouring and pock-marking of the ground was noted in this area. Numerous homes were swept away along Lingerfelt Road as well. When found, the safe's door had been ripped open and completely off. An underground storm shelter in this area had much of its dirt covering scoured away, the occupants of which reported that structure heaved upwards slightly as the tornado passed overhead. Pavement was scoured from several roads in the area, and a concrete porch was torn away and broken in half at another residence that was swept away.

The tornado continued across the eastern fringes of Sylvania, where a church was completely destroyed, a section of sidewalk was pulled up, and additional homes were swept away and scattered, though it was revealed that these homes were pushed off of their foundations with limited anchorage. A high-end EF4 rating was applied in this area as a result. The tornado continued to level additional homes as it passed near Henagar and Ider, at which point it began to closely parallel Interstate 59. It tracked  into Georgia, crossing Interstate 59 and moving through Rising Fawn before lifting outside of the community at 6:55 p.m. CDT/7:55 p.m. EDT (23:55 UTC). Damage in Georgia was limited to trees and power lines and minor structural damage to a few homes. This tornado came from the same supercell that produced the EF4 tornado that hit the town of Ringgold, Georgia, about 30 minutes later.

Shoal Creek Valley–Ohatchee–Piedmont, Alabama/Cave Spring, Georgia

After the Tuscaloosa/Birmingham tornado lifted, the same supercell produced another tornado, at 6:28 p.m. CDT (23:28 UTC) near Argo, Alabama, in eastern Jefferson County. It went on to devastate the rural community of Shoal Creek Valley, located between Ashville and Ragland in St. Clair County, Alabama.

After touching down southwest of Argo, the tornado continued northeast of Odenville, producing EF0 to EF1 tree damage. Many homes were left with only interior walls standing in this area. Some section of this path segment had damage that was much worse on one side of the road than the other, while other areas showed equal devastation on both sides of the road. The tornado reached mid-range EF4 intensity towards the end of the valley as it approached Neely Henry Lake. Additional homes were destroyed in this area, one was swept away, and thousands of trees were mowed down and debarked. The tornado maintained EF4 strength as it crossed the lake and tore across the north edge of Ohatchee, completely leveling or sweeping away numerous waterfront homes. The official count of homes destroyed or heavily damaged in Shoal Creek Valley and Ohatchee was 256. Most phone lines, power lines and poles were destroyed, and water lines were severed by uprooted trees. Entire homes were leveled, and in some cases completely removed by the storm, leaving only brick steps, a fireplace and chimney, or a slab behind. Livestock were thrown and killed, and the initial human death toll of 13 would eventually rise to 15 in the area. The tornado caused mainly EF3 damage to homes as it passed north of Wellington, though a small pocket of EF4 damage occurred in the small rural community of Webster's Chapel, where a church and several homes were completely leveled or swept away, trees were reduced to stumps, and many other homes were left with only interior walls standing. The Silver Lakes Golf Course also sustained major damage in this area, where at least 50,000 trees were flattened and buildings were damaged or destroyed. Continuing northeast, the tornado produced high-end EF3 damage north of Piedmont, destroying mobile homes, snapping numerous trees, and leveling a house. Additional homes were leveled at high-end EF3 intensity near The Indian Mountain Tract before it continued across rural areas into Georgia. Many outbuildings and homes were destroyed, and many trees were downed across Polk, Floyd, and Bartow counties. Severe damage was noted near Cave Spring where chicken houses and homes were damaged or destroyed, and several people were injured. The damage in Georgia was rated EF2.

This tornado's final death toll, combining fatalities in both St. Clair and Calhoun counties in Alabama, would eventually come to 22.

Ringgold, Georgia/Southeast Tennessee

A violent multiple-vortex tornado struck portions of extreme northern Georgia and southeast Tennessee during the mid-evening hours of April 27. It touched down along Davis Ridge Road in Catoosa County, Georgia, and moved through the town of Ringgold at EF3 strength, destroying numerous homes and businesses. A Baymont Inn & Suites, located near Interstate 75 was partially destroyed by the tornado, along with a McDonald's, a Taco Bell, and several gas stations located on Highway 151 in Ringgold at the Interstate 75 interchange (exit 348). The Catoosa County Department of Family and Children Services and other businesses on Nashville Street in downtown Ringgold were also heavily damaged. The Kellerhals Center for Visual Arts Education at Ringgold High School was destroyed (RHS itself had minor damage), and Ringgold Middle School was heavily damaged. Past downtown Ringgold, the tornado reached EF4 intensity as it tore through a subdivision along Cherokee Valley Road at the north edge of town. Twelve homes were completely obliterated and swept away at that location (though they were not well-built). Several trees were denuded and debarked in this area as well. There were 74 destroyed homes and/or businesses, 60 with major damage, and 118 with minor damage for a total of 252 affected structures in the Ringgold area. Eight people were killed, mainly at the subdivision along Cherokee Valley Road.

The storm then crossed the Tennessee state line at 8:28 p.m. EDT (00:28 UTC), and moved into Hamilton County, Tennessee, striking the small town of Apison at high-end EF4 strength, where large homes were leveled or swept away, 150 others were damaged, and thousands of trees were snapped and uprooted. The tornado then crossed into Bradley County at low-end EF4 strength, moving across the southern and eastern fringes of Cleveland and affecting mainly residential areas, though a few businesses were damaged or destroyed as well. Subdivisions in the southern part of the city sustained major damage, with numerous houses destroyed and a few that were leveled. Four people were killed in Cleveland, and many others were injured. Several trees were felled in Polk County as the tornado weakened to EF1-strength, before it crossed into McMinn County. The tornado re-intensified to EF2 and destroyed two houses and a mobile home before lifting south of Athens.

The tornado killed 20 people and injured hundreds more along its  path across Catoosa, Hamilton, Bradley, Polk, and McMinn counties. This tornado was only the eighth in Georgia to be categorized as an F4/EF4 on the (Enhanced) Fujita scale since 1950, when current official tornado records begin. It would be the last EF4 tornado in the state until March 26, 2021, when Newnan was struck just after midnight.

All roads in and out of Ringgold were closed until the morning of April 29; after roads leading to the affected areas were re-opened, residents and business owners were allowed to return, being allowed entry only by providing identification, and informing police a reason why they were entering into the area, in order to curb looting in the storm-damaged areas.

Non-tornadic effects

This storm system prolonged an ongoing heavy rain event, which began across Arkansas and Missouri on April 22. On April 25, 2011, thunderstorms with high winds swept through parts of southern and southeastern Ohio. Straight-line winds estimated at  uprooted trees, damaged roofs, and downed power lines through Perry County, Ohio, and Athens County, Ohio. Strong thunderstorms and heavy downpours which led to flooding were also reported in areas across Upstate New York with heavy flooding in the Syracuse area. The rain also saturated hundreds of lakes in the Adirondack mountains. Interstate 81 was briefly shut down in the downtown area at traffic hour and the State University of New York Upstate Medical University also closed briefly due to flooding in the lobby. Heavy rains combined with rapid snowmelt caused widespread flooding across Vermont on April 26–27. Numerous roads were closed across Vermont due to flooding, with some roads being completely washed out.

Farther south, flash flooding late on April 26 resulted in two fatalities in Monroe, Louisiana, after an apartment complex was swamped. The flooding there was considered to be worse than the flooding after Hurricane Gustav in 2008. The resulting flash flooding in central Arkansas also resulted in five people losing their lives. Many roads were closed due to the flooding there. The flooding was mitigated somewhat by a significant drought that had existed before the storm.

Severe thunderstorms were reported as far north as Northern Ontario on the evening of April 26. Heavy rains and minor flooding were also reported in Northern Ontario from April 26–28. Windstorms were also reported in Southern Ontario and Southern Quebec which resulted in several injuries and one death, damages and power outages.

Other fatalities due to straight-line winds occurred early on April 26 in McComb, Mississippi and early on April 27 in Moody, Alabama, Vestavia Hills, Alabama, and Franklin, Tennessee from the squall line with embedded tornadoes.

Aftermath

Alabama Governor Robert J. Bentley declared a state of emergency in the state of Alabama on April 27, due to storm damage from severe thunderstorms earlier that day as well as forthcoming severe weather later that day. States of emergency were also declared in Arkansas, Kentucky, Mississippi, Missouri, Tennessee, and Oklahoma because of the flooding and tornadoes. Following the tornado outbreak on the evening of April 27, President Barack Obama granted a federal emergency declaration for the state of Alabama, giving federal assistance, including search and rescue assets, to the affected region.

More than 2,000 National Guard troops were deployed to Alabama, assisting local and state first responders in search and rescue efforts. President Obama visited the affected areas of Alabama on April 29. Also on April 29, he approved a federal disaster declaration for seven Mississippi counties: Clarke, Greene, Hinds, Jasper, Kemper, Lafayette, and Monroe.

Electricity outage
Storms through the area severely damaged Tennessee Valley Authority (TVA)'s power grid for transmitting electricity throughout the region. The towers supported some 90 transmission lines, a mixture of 500kV and 161kV lines. Those lines provided power from TVA to 128 regional distributors.

TVA lost the ability to transmit power from both Browns Ferry Nuclear Power Plant and Widows Creek Fossil Plant after the storms on April 27, requiring both to be shut down. The nuclear plant's cold shutdown was supported by diesel generators for four days until a second 161kV line could be restored to the plant. The loss of redundant off-site power required a "notification of unusual event", the lowest of four levels of concern dictated by the NRC. Some 60 percent of the sirens for warning residents of worse problems around Browns Ferry were disabled by the storms, and the plant had to arrange plans to use cars with loudspeakers to warn residents in case of another problem. The Nuclear Regulatory Commission stated at a press conference: "The plants' conditions are stable and are being placed in a cooled-down condition."

Huntsville was the largest city with no electricity from TVA. All the traffic lights were off, a dusk-to-dawn curfew was imposed, students were sent home from United States Space Camp, and the Panoply Arts Festival was canceled. Power was restored gradually to Huntsville, beginning with 3 percent on the morning of May 1. Only localized outages remained eight days after the storm. In addition to traffic and safety issues, the outage caused difficulties with water treatment and distribution and retail of all kinds, including gasoline and food purchases.

Ontario electricity outages were minor, mostly caused by the windstorms of April 28. Although they affected thousands of people at different times throughout the day, all power was restored by the end of the day.

See also

 List of North American tornadoes and tornado outbreaks
 List of F5 and EF5 tornadoes
 List of F4 and EF4 tornadoes
 List of F4 and EF4 tornadoes (2010–2019)
 Tornadoes of 2011
 List of disasters in the United States by death toll
 Tornado records
 Tri-State Tornado – Deadliest tornado in North America, and made March 18, 1925, the deadliest tornado day recorded in United States.
 1932 Deep South tornado outbreak – Deadliest tornado outbreak in Alabama history, including an F4 tornado that tracked through Tuscaloosa.
 1936 Tupelo–Gainesville tornado outbreak – Infamous tornado outbreak occurring on April 5–6, 1936. Deadliest U.S. tornado outbreak since the March 1925 (Tri-State Tornado) outbreak, thus surpassing the March 1932, April 1974, and April 2011 outbreaks in total fatalities.
 April 1956 Birmingham tornado – F4 tornado that hit the northern Birmingham suburbs on April 15, 1956.
 1974 Super Outbreak – Infamous tornado outbreak that occurred on April 3–4, 1974, similar in severity to the 2011 Super Outbreak; though the 2011 event surpassed the 1974 Super Outbreak as the largest recorded outbreak.
 April 1977 Birmingham tornado – F5 tornado that hit the northern Birmingham suburbs on April 4, 1977.
 1994 Palm Sunday tornado outbreak – March 27, 1994, outbreak that produced an F4 tornado in St. Clair, Calhoun and Cherokee Counties in north-central Alabama.
 April 1998 Birmingham tornado – F5 tornado that struck western parts of Birmingham on April 8, 1998.
 December 2000 Tuscaloosa tornado – F4 tornado that hit southeast suburbs of Tuscaloosa on December 16, 2000.

References

Further reading
 
 The Influence of Terrain during the 27 April 2011 Super Tornado Outbreak and 5 July 2012 Derecho around the Great Smoky Mountains National Park

External links

 NWS Service Assessment
 Hook–Echo.com Tornado Outbreak Overview
 Time lapse visualization of the April 25–28 tornado outbreak
 Interactive map of all the tornado paths during the April 25–28 outbreak
 Videotaped presentations on the 27 April 2011 Super Tornado Outbreak in east Tennessee and southwest Virginia (NWS Morristown, TN)

Emergency Tornado Aid
 National Red Cross
 Tuscaloosa News People Finder – Set up by local newspaper to aid in finding loved ones and friends missing in the tornado.

Memorials
 University of Alabama Holds Memorial Ceremony Honoring Students who Died in Disaster as well as First Responders

Pictures from Tuscaloosa, Alabama
 Tornado Damage in Tuscaloosa, Alabama

Video
 Overhead view of Cullman, Alabama damage
 Detailed Radar loop of Northern Alabama, Eastern Mississippi, and Southern Tennessee

Tornado outbreaks
F5 tornadoes by date
Tornadoes in Alabama
Tornadoes in Arkansas
Tornadoes in Georgia (U.S. state)
Tornadoes in Kentucky
Tornadoes in Louisiana
Tornadoes in Maryland
Tornadoes in Mississippi
Tornadoes in New York (state)
Tornadoes in North Carolina
Tornadoes in Oklahoma
Tornadoes in Ontario
Tornadoes in Pennsylvania
Tornadoes in Tennessee
Tornadoes in Texas
Tornadoes in Virginia
Tornadoes of 2011
Tornado,2011-04-27
Tuscaloosa, Alabama
History of Birmingham, Alabama
2011 in Alabama
2011 in Arkansas
2011 in Georgia (U.S. state)
2011 in Kentucky
2011 in Louisiana
2011 in Maryland
2011 in Mississippi
2011 in New York (state)
2011 in North Carolina
2011 in Oklahoma
2011 in Pennsylvania
2011 in Tennessee
2011 in Texas
2011 in Virginia
Tornado,2011-04-27
Tornadoes in Canada by date
Articles containing video clips
April 2011 events in North America
Super Outbreak
2011 meteorology